High Stoop is a village in County Durham, England. It is situated a short distance to the north-west of Tow Law, on the A68.

References

Villages in County Durham
Wolsingham